John Candlish (bapt. 28 April 1816 – 17 March 1874) was a British glass bottle manufacturer and Liberal Party politician.

Early life
Candlish was born in Tarset, Northumberland, the eldest son of farmer John Candlish and Mary, née Robson. After Mary died in 1820, Candlish senior moved the family to Sunderland where the latter found work at Ayres Quay bottleworks, managed by his brother, Robert.

Candlish was educated at local Dissenter schools and then at an academy in North Shields before returning to Sunderland, aged eleven, to work in the bottleworks. Aged fourteen, his uncle secured him an apprenticeship as a draper and he began to study the French language and joined a debating society.

Early career
In 1836, Candlish became a partner in a drapery business, and later that year purchased the newspaper, Sunderland Beacon, but it failed within six months. Other short-lived ventures followed into coal exporting and shipbuilding at Southwick in 1844. In 1851, he returned to publishing by founding Sunderland News and was a secretary at the Sunderland Gas Company.

Bottle works
A turning point came to Candlish's career in 1855 when he acquired the lease of Seaham Bottle Works at Seaham harbour with his childhood friend, Robert Greenwell. He later bought out his partner and patronage was given by nearby resident Frederick Stewart, 4th Marquess of Londonderry and the works renamed Londonderry Bottle Works, becoming the largest bottling business in Europe. Candlish purchased a site at Diamond Hall in Millfield and by 1872, had six glasshouses located in Seaham and four in Millfield.

Politics
In 1848, Candlish had been elected to Sunderland Borough Council and was mayor of the town in 1858 and 1861 and held other public offices as a river commissioner, magistrate, Chairman of the Board of Guardians and principal of the Sunderland Orphan Asylum.

Candlish contested for one of Sunderland's two parliamentary seats at the 1865 general election but was defeated by Henry Fenwick and James Hartley. Fenwick's resignation a year later brought success for Candlish in the subsequent by-election. He held the seat until he stood down from the House of Commons at the 1874 general election.

Family
In 1845, Candlish married his first cousin, Elizabeth Candlish (the daughter of his uncle, Robert). She died on 21 March 1900, aged 86. Their daughter, Elizabeth Penelope, later married politician William Shepherd Allen.

Death and legacy
Candlish undertook a parliamentary visit to India in 1870 (where he, incidentally, was presented with a bottle of beer manufactured by his own company), a trip which was blamed for the subsequent breakdown of his health. He died on 17 March 1874 in Cannes, France, and is buried in Sunderland Cemetery (Ryhope Road, Sunderland). In 1875, a statue of Candlish by Charles Bacon was unveiled in the centre of Mowbray Park and John Candlish Road, near his glassworks at Diamond Hall, is named after him.

References

Oxford Dictionary of National Biography – Candlish, John
Greenwell, Bill – A Fish In A Tree

 Candlish Shipyard – Southwick Yard

External links 
 
 Candlish Genealogy – Glensudi – Glensudi is owned by Benjamin Thomas Fearby O'Neill, descendant of John Candlish's brother, Robert
 J & R Candlish Shipbuilding, Sunderland –
 Candlish Shipyard – Southwick Yard

1815 births
1874 deaths
Burials in England
Liberal Party (UK) MPs for English constituencies
People from Northumberland
UK MPs 1865–1868
UK MPs 1868–1874